Mahajana College ( Makājaṉāk Kallūri) is a provincial school in Tellippalai, Sri Lanka.

History
The school was founded in October 1910 by scholar and poet T. A. Thuraiyappapillai.

Mahajana English High School is founded by Pavalar T. A. Thuraiappahpillai in 1910.

1949 - Raised to Grade I school

1961 - College is raised to Super Grade status.

1962 - The college is vested in the Crown as from 1 February and becomes a Government Institution for all intents and purposes.

1976 - Mr. P. Kanagasabapathy becomes the Principanl

1976 Oct - Former Principal Mr. T.T. Jeyaratnam passes away.

1990 - Mahajana temporarily moves to Alaveddy Arunothaya College.

and later moves to Pandatharippu Girls College next year.

On September 15, 1999, Mahajana College moved back to the original location at Ambanai.

See also
 :Category:Alumni of Mahajana College, Tellippalai
 List of schools in Northern Province, Sri Lanka

References

External links
 Mahajana College
 Old Students' Association, Canada
 Old Students' Association, Paris, France
 Old Students' Association, United Kingdom

Educational institutions established in 1910
Provincial schools in Sri Lanka
Schools in Tellippalai
1910 establishments in Ceylon